Soroti Fruit Processing Factory, also Soroti Fruit Factory, is a fruit processing plant in Soroti, Uganda.

Location
The geographical coordinates of the fruit processing facility are: 01°46'32.0"N, 33°37'05.0"E (Latitude:1.775556; Longitude:33.618056).

Overview
The government of Uganda (GOU), with the assistance of the Korea International Cooperation Agency (KOICA) and in partnership with the Teso Tropical Fruit Growers Cooperative Union (TETFGCU), decided to establish a fruit processing factory in Soroti District to take advantage of the abundant citrus crop in the Teso sub-region and the high yield per tree. GOU provided the land, utilities, and infrastructure. KOICA set aside US$7.4 million for equipment and training and is building the factory. And TETFGCU will grow the fruit that the factory will process. Citrus fruit and mangoes are the principal fruits under consideration.

Ownership
The ownership of the factory is as depicted in the table below:

Timetable
Construction of the factory began in April 2015 and was scheduled to be completed in May 2016. Installing and commissioning the machinery and equipment was anticipated from August 2016 to October 2016. The factory was scheduled to commence commercial operation in November 2016.

After years of delay, the factory began test runs of its  production lines in May 2018, with commercial commissioning planned for August 2018. Production is planned to be phased, starting with one 8-hour shift and gradually increasing to two and eventually three daily shifts.

Commercial production is expected to begin in April 2019. The factory has capacity to process six metric tonnes of fruit on a daily basis.

On 13 April 2019, president Yoweri Museveni launched commercial production at the completed factory. At the beginning, 150 employees were hired, with the expectation to increase to 250 people when the factory runs at maximum capacity.

In October 2019, the factory began producing mango juice under the label "Teju", short for "Teso Juice". It is expected that Teju will soon be served on the revived Uganda Airlines.

References

External links
New fruit factory to change farmers’ fortunes in Teso
Progress at Soroti Fruit Factory being constructed at Arapai by UDC in collaboration with KOICA

Food manufacturers of Uganda
Companies established in 2014
Soroti
Soroti District
Eastern Region, Uganda
2014 establishments in Uganda 
Food and drink companies established in 2014